Castletown may refer to:
 Castle town, a settlement built adjacent to or surrounding a castle

Places

Australia
Castletown, Western Australia, a suburb of the remote town of Esperance

Republic of Ireland
 Castletownroche, County Cork
 Castletown, County Cork (disambiguation), several townlands and villages
 Castletown, County Laois
 Castletown, County Limerick, a civil parish in County Limerick
 Castletown House, County Kildare
 Castletownbere, County Cork
 Castletown-Geoghegan, County Westmeath
 Castletown, County Wexford
 Castletown Kilpatrick, County Meath; see C. Y. O'Connor

Isle of Man
 Castletown, Isle of Man

United Kingdom
Castletown, Cheshire
Castletown, Dorset
Castletown, Highland, Scotland
Castletown, Penrith, Cumbria
Castletown, County Antrim, a townland in Islandmagee, County Antrim, Northern Ireland
Castletown, County Tyrone, a townland in Carnteel parish, County Tyrone, Northern Ireland
Castletown, Sunderland
RAF Castletown, Scotland

Other uses
 Castletown (horse), a New Zealand Thoroughbred racehorse
 Castletown, County Mayo, the fictional setting of the mockumentary Hardy Bucks

See also
 Castleton (disambiguation)